The 11th Massachusetts Regiment was raised on September 16, 1776, under Colonel Ebenezer Francis at Boston, Massachusetts. The 11th Mass. would see action at the Battle of Hubbardton, Battle of Saratoga and the Battle of Monmouth. The regiment was disbanded on January 1, 1781, at West Point, New York.

Colonel Ebenezer Francis was commanding officer of the 11th Massachusetts Regiment from November 6, 1776, until July 7, 1777, when he was killed at the Battle of Hubbardton. Colonel Benjamin Tupper was commanding officer from July 1, 1777, until January 1, 1781.

External links
Bibliography of the Continental Army in Massachusetts compiled by the United States Army Center of Military History
http://valleyforgemusterroll.org/regiments/ma11.asp

11th Massachusetts Regiment